Turkana may refer to:

 Turkana people of Kenya and Ethiopia
 Turkana language of Kenya and Ethiopia
 Lake Turkana in Kenya
 Lake Turkana National Parks
 Turkana County in Kenya
 Turkana IV, fictional planet in a Star Trek Next Generation episode
 Turkana, fictional planet in the Star Wars expanded universe
 The Turkana Basin geological feature.

See also
Turkana Boy